Daughton is a surname. Notable people with the surname include:

James Daughton (born 1950), American actor
Ralph Hunter Daughton (1885–1958), American politician
Thomas F. Daughton (born 1961), American diplomat

See also
Draughton (disambiguation)